The fundus of the eye is the interior surface of the eye opposite the lens and includes the retina, optic disc, macula, fovea, and posterior pole. The fundus can be examined by ophthalmoscopy and/or fundus photography.

Variation
The color of the fundus varies both between and within species. In one study of primates the retina is blue, green, yellow, orange, and red;  only the human fundus (from a lightly pigmented blond person) is red. The major differences noted among the "higher" primate species  were size and regularity of the border of macular area, size and shape of the optic disc, apparent 'texturing' of retina, and pigmentation of retina.

Clinical significance
Medical signs that can be detected from observation of eye fundus (generally by funduscopy) include hemorrhages, exudates, cotton wool spots, blood vessel abnormalities (tortuosity, pulsation and new vessels) and pigmentation. Arteriolar constriction, seen as "silver wiring", and vascular tortuosities are seen in hypertensive retinopathy.

The eye's fundus is the only part of the human body where the microcirculation can be observed directly. The diameter of the blood vessels around the optic disc is about 150 μm, and an ophthalmoscope allows observation of blood vessels with diameters as small as 10 μm.

See also

 Dilated fundus examination
 Fundus camera
 Leukocoria
 Red-eye effect
 Tapetum lucidum

References

Human eye anatomy